"Miss Lonely Eyes" (ミス・ロンリー・アイズ) is the fourth single by 1986 Omega Tribe, released by VAP on July 15, 1987. The song charted at No. 2 on the Oricon charts.

Background and composition 
The single was the first song that was not a tie-up song and a first cassette release by 1986 Omega Tribe, as well as having the first music video that was not a promotional video. The song wasn't sung live in The Best Ten.

The B-side, "Interstate," was composed by the band's guitarist Mitsuya Kurokawa. "Interstate" was included in the compilation album Our Graduation.

Track listing

Charts

Weekly charts

Year-end charts

References 

Omega Tribe (Japanese band) songs
1987 singles
1987 songs